Agatha Christie: The ABC Murders is a point-and-click adventure mystery video game developed by Artefacts Studio and published by Anuman under their Microïds brand for Microsoft Windows, Linux, Mac OS X, PlayStation 4 and Xbox One in February 2016. It was later released for Nintendo Switch in October 2020.

Differences from the novel
The game retains the main plot from the novel, The A.B.C. Murders, and also the murderer's identity. However, there are some changes, like the number of victims, which are now only three, as the fourth planned victim, (here a man called Dick Dunbar, owner of the Black Swan hotel) is saved by Poirot. In the game, all victims are related, as Alice Archer and Betty Bernard (together with Cust and Dunbar) are former patients of Sir Carmichael Clarke (who is a doctor in the game). The finding of the burnt patient files by Poirot at Combeside, and the recovery of these files, allows Poirot to discover the next victim's identity and prevent the murder (this clue also gives players a strong hint about who the real murderer is, even it's not necessary to know it to finish the game). There are two endings in the game, depending on whether Poirot loads his gun with real bullets or blanks, before handing it to Hastings just prior to the final meeting.

Reception
The game was met with a mixed reception.

See also
Yesterday Origins

References

External links

2016 video games
Adventure games
Detective video games
Mystery video games
Hercule Poirot
Linux games
MacOS games
Windows games
Nintendo Switch games
PlayStation 4 games
Xbox One games
Microïds games
Video games developed in France
Video games set in Hampshire
Video games set in Devon
Video games set in East Sussex
Single-player video games